Muhammad Yaqoob Shaikh is a Pakistani politician who has been a member of the National Assembly of Pakistan from August 2018 till January 2023. He joined PTI in May 2018

Political career
He was elected to the National Assembly of Pakistan as a candidate of Pakistan Tehreek-e-Insaf (PTI) from Constituency NA-39 (Dera Ismail Khan-II) in 2018 Pakistani general election. He received  79334 votes and defeated JUI chief Moulana Fazal-ur-Rehman. Rehman got 52031.

References

Living people
Pakistani MNAs 2018–2023
Year of birth missing (living people)